The National Institute of Public Health – National Institute of Hygiene or NIPH–NIH, ( or NIZP–PZH) is a research institute in Poland focussed on public health. It was founded on 21 November 1918.

References

Other references

External links
 homepage
 Profile of the PZH from Eurohealthnet.eu (accessed July 18, 2012) 
 Przegląd Epidemiologiczny (journal)

Organizations established in 1918
1918 establishments in Poland
Medical research institutes in Poland
National public health agencies